Race-Vine is a rapid transit passenger rail station on SEPTA's Broad Street Line. It is located at 300 North Broad Street (PA 611) in the Center City Philadelphia. It serves both local and express trains. 

The station is named after Vine Street, which today acts as frontage roads along Interstate 676 and nearby Race Street, although the given address is closer to westbound Vine than Race. This stop is also used as the official stop for the Pennsylvania Convention Center on the Broad Street Line; signs will direct passengers to the appropriate exits. However, riding the Broad Street Line one stop further south to City Hall and then connecting to the Market–Frankford Line East toward Frankford and then exiting at 11th Street station will bring passengers right inside the Pennsylvania Convention Center and the Fashion District.

In addition to the Convention Center and other sights on the westernmost edge of Chinatown, the Race–Vine station serves several office buildings, including Thomas Jefferson University, the Parkway Museum District, Roman Catholic High School, and Drexel University's School of Nursing.

Passengers may connect to SEPTA City Bus Routes 4, 16, and 27 here, in addition to a number of NJ Transit bus routes, which board on the northeast corner of Broad and Vine Streets. Until the mid-1990s, there was a concourse leading up Broad Street from City Hall to the Race Street side of the station.

Station layout

References

Gallery

External links
 

 Vine Street entrance from Google Maps Street View
 Race Street entrance from Google Maps Street View

SEPTA Broad Street Line stations
Railway stations in Philadelphia
Railway stations in the United States opened in 1928
Railway stations located underground in Pennsylvania